King Momo or King Momos or King Momus, (Rei Momo in Portuguese or Rey Momo in Spanish) is considered the king of Carnivals in numerous Latin American festivities, mainly in Brazil and Colombia. His appearance signifies the beginning of the Carnival festivities. Each carnival has its own King Momo, who is often given the key to the city. Traditionally, a tall, fat man is chosen to fulfill the role because the original King Momo was of that physical stature. 

In Argentina and Uruguay, Rey Momo is more often represented by a big, sometimes monumental, doll made of papier-mâché over a wooden or wire structure.  In these cases it is carried in a tow or at the top of a truck, and presides the carnival with a royal court of dancers. While a doll, it conserves its traditional features: flamboyant and colorful clothing, a smiling or joyful face and a prominent belly. It used to be burnt at the end of the festivities, also being its climax, but this practice is being discouraged in recent times for safety reasons. Also in the former Portuguese-ruled Goa, India, at the Carnival Parade, a person is selected to play the part of King Momo. Sixtus Eric Dias from Candolim was selected in 2021.

Origin
King Momus derives from the Greek god Momus .

King Momos of Rio de Janeiro

Probably the most famous of the King Momos are found in Rio de Janeiro where the tradition of a presiding king goes back to 1933. :

King Momos of Santos 

Waldemar Esteves da Cunha (born 1920 - died 2013)  was King Momo of Santos from 1950 to 1956 and from 1958 to 1990, and until he was 92 and pensioned, he was the oldest Momo in Brazil.

See also
 Rex parade

References

Brazilian Carnival